Project CETI is an international initiative to understand the communication of sperm whales using advances in Artificial Intelligence. The project has an interdisciplinary scientific board including marine biologists, artificial intelligence researchers, roboticists, theoretical computer scientists, and linguists. The project has a base on the island of Dominica where recordings are being collected. A roadmap has been published. The organization has been selected as a TED Audacious Project.

References

Organizations established in 2020
Science in society